Adam Graham is an American politician who served as a city councillor for and the mayor of The Village, Oklahoma until his resignation on July 18, 2022. Graham was the first openly-gay and youngest mayor of The Village, Oklahoma.

Career
Graham was first elected to serve on the The Village, Oklahoma's city council in 2019. In May 2022, he was voted Mayor of the Village, becoming the youngest mayor in the towns history at 29.

Resignation
He resigned on July 18, 2022, citing harassment including being followed home from meetings, being threatened while walking his dog, being harassed at Starbucks, and having his car tires slashed. Graham blamed the harassment on an incident with neighboring city Nichols Hills police, where body camera footage showed Graham telling officers they had no jurisdiction to issue traffic tickets in The Village. While some reporting after his resignation identified Graham as the first openly-gay mayor in Oklahoma, Graham is at least the second openly-gay mayor after Achille, Oklahoma mayor David Northcutt.

References

Living people
21st-century American politicians
Oklahoma Democrats
Mayors of places in Oklahoma
Oklahoma city council members
LGBT people in Oklahoma politics
Year of birth missing (living people)